Portugal participated at the 2018 Summer Youth Olympics in Buenos Aires, Argentina from 6 October to 18 October 2018.

Athletics

Beach handball

Canoeing

Portugal qualified one boat based on its performance at the 2018 World Qualification Event.

 Boys' C1 - 1 boat

Fencing

Futsal

Summary

Group D

Semi-finals

Finals

Gymnastics

Acrobatic
Portugal qualified a mixed pair based on its performance at the 2018 Acrobatic Gymnastics World Championship.

 Mixed pair - 1 team of 2 athletes

Artistic
Portugal qualified one gymnast based on its performance at the 2018 European Junior Championship.

 Girls' artistic individual all-around - 1 quota

Trampoline
Portugal qualified one gymnasts based on its performance at the 2018 European Junior Championship.

 Boys' trampoline - 1 quota

Karate

 1 quota – Girls' −53kg

Modern pentathlon

Roller speed skating

Sailing

Portugal qualified one boat based on its performance at the Techno 293+ European Qualifier.

 Boys' Techno 293+ - 1 boat

Swimming

Triathlon

Portugal qualified two athletes based on its performance at the 2018 European Youth Olympic Games Qualifier.

Individual

Relay

References

2018 in Portuguese sport
Nations at the 2018 Summer Youth Olympics
Portugal at the Youth Olympics